General elections were held in Saint Lucia on 27 April 1992. The result was a victory for the United Workers Party, which won eleven of the seventeen seats. Voter turnout was 62.8%.

Results

References

Saint Lucia
Elections in Saint Lucia
General
Saint Lucia